Chellis Glendinning (born 1947) is an author and activist. She has been called a pioneer in the concept of ecopsychology—the belief that promoting environmentalism is healthy. She is a social-change activist with an emphasis on feminism, bioregionalism, and indigenous rights.  She promotes human cultures which are land-based and confined to bioregions, and is a critic of the use of technology.

Career
In 2007 Glendinning's bilingual folk opera De Un Lado Al Otro, was presented at the Lensic Theater in Santa Fe, New Mexico.

Glendinning graduated from the University of California, Berkeley in social sciences in 1969.  She received her doctorate in psychology from Columbia Pacific University.

Her papers are housed in the Labadie Collection of the University of Michigan.

Books

Waking Up in the Nuclear Age.  William Morrow, 1987. 
When Technology Wounds: The Human Consequences of Progress.  New York:  William Morrow,  1990. 
My Name Is Chellis and I’m in Recovery from Western Civilization.  Gabriola BC Canada: New Society Publishers/New Catalyst/ Sustainability Classics,  2007;  and Boston: Shambhala Publications,  1994. 
Off the Map: An Expedition Deep into Empire and the Global Economy,  New Society Publishers,  2002;  and Off the Map: An Expedition Deep into Imperialism,  the Global Economy and Other Earthly Whereabouts, Shambhala Publications,  1999.  
 A Map: From the Old Connecticut Path to the Rio Grande Valley and All the Meaning In between. Great Barrington MA: E.F. Schumacher Society, 1999.
Chiva: A Village Takes on the Global Heroin Trade.  New Society Publishers,  2005.  
Objetos. Editorial 3600, 2018. 
In the Company of Rebels.  New Village Press 2019.

See also 
 Anarcho-primitivism
 Deep ecology

References

External links
 Official website
 Blog
 

1947 births
Living people
American activists
American psychology writers
American psychotherapists
American social sciences writers
American women non-fiction writers
Columbia Pacific University alumni
Neo-Luddites
University of California, Berkeley alumni